Yingzhou or Ying Prefecture was a zhou (prefecture) in imperial China in modern northwestern Anhui, seated in modern Fuyang. During the later parts of the Qing dynasty it was known as Yingzhou Prefecture. It existed (intermittently) from 528 until 1912.

Modern-day Yingzhou District in Fuyang keeps its name.

Geography
The administrative region of Yingzhou in the Tang dynasty falls within modern northwestern Anhui. It probably includes parts of modern: 
 Under the administration of Fuyang:
 Fuyang: Yingzhou District, Yingdong District and Yingquan District 
 Jieshou
 Taihe County 
 Linquan County 
 Funan County 
 Yingshang County
 Under the administration of Huainan:
 Fengtai County

In the Qing dynasty it also includes parts of modern:
 Under the administration of Bozhou:
 Lixin County
 Mengcheng County
 Woyang County
 Under the administration of Lu'an:
 Huoqiu County

References
 

Prefectures of the Tang dynasty
Prefectures of Later Liang (Five Dynasties)
Prefectures of Later Tang
Prefectures of Later Jin (Five Dynasties)
Prefectures of Later Han (Five Dynasties)
Prefectures of Later Zhou
Prefectures of the Song dynasty
Prefectures of the Yuan dynasty
Prefectures of the Ming dynasty
Prefectures of the Qing dynasty
Prefectures of the Jin dynasty (1115–1234)
Former prefectures in Anhui